Felipe Tapia (born 25 April 1995) is a Chilean swimmer. He competed in the men's 1500 metre freestyle event at the 2016 Summer Olympics.

References

External links
 

1995 births
Living people
Chilean male freestyle swimmers
Olympic swimmers of Chile
Swimmers at the 2016 Summer Olympics
Place of birth missing (living people)